KNWU may refer to:

 KNWU (FM), a radio station (91.5 FM) licensed to serve Forks, Washington, the United States
 Royal Dutch Cycling Union, (In Dutch: KNWU, Koninklijke Nederlandsche Wielren Unie)